Shannon Tatlock (born March 15, 1984 as Shannon Williams) is a Canadian curler from Moncton, New Brunswick.

Career
Tatlock competed in three Canadian Curling Club Championships in 2011, 2012 and 2014. She skipped the team at all three of her appearances with her best finish being 4–2 in both 2011 and 2014. She has won two events on the World Curling Tour, the 2010 Lady Monctonian Invitational Spiel and the 2011 Rodd Curling Classic.

Tatlock made the playoffs at provincials for the first time at the 2015 New Brunswick Scotties Tournament of Hearts where she lost in the semifinal to Melissa Adams. She made the playoffs the following year as well, but lost in the 3 vs 4 page playoff game. Tatlock would join the Sarah Mallais rink as their alternate for the 2018–19 season. Team Mallais would make it to the final of the 2019 New Brunswick Scotties Tournament of Hearts where they lost 6–3 to the Andrea Crawford rink.

Personal life
Tatlock has one child and is a former teacher, who now works as a Financial Advisor at her father’s company, Kevin R Williams Financial Services Inc. She obtained her Certified Financial Planner designation in June 2017 and her Chartered Life Underwriter designation in June 2020.

Teams

References

External links

Curlers from New Brunswick
Living people
Sportspeople from Moncton
1984 births
Canadian women curlers